The Sucat People's Park, also known simply as Sucat Park and Sucmun Park, is a lakefront park located on the shore of Laguna de Bay in Muntinlupa, Metro Manila, the Philippines. It is a public community park in a reclaimed portion of the village of Sucat just north of the Sucat Thermal Power Plant on the border between Purok 3 and Purok 4, east of Don Juan Bayview Subdivision. Entry is from M.L. Quezon Street (Alabang–Pateros Road) and Meralco Road from the Sucat Interchange of the South Luzon Expressway and Dr. Santos Avenue (Sucat Road).

The plan for the  park at Sucat was announced in April 2012 during the tenure of Mayor Aldrin San Pedro.

Amenities in the park include gazebos, a central fountain, a covered court, cycling and running tracks, parking lot and a daycare center, as well as several food and beverage stalls. Near the park's entrance on M.L. Quezon Street is the Sucat Barangay Hall, Sucat Health Center and Sucat railway station. The park is lined with palm trees and has a boardwalk and pier extending into Laguna de Bay. The JRF Sucat Covered Court, named after Mayor Jaime R. Fresnedi, is also used as a venue for professional boxing, having hosted several matches in the past including those of local boxers Toto Landero, Edison Berwela, Adones Cabalquinto, Vergil Puton and Jayson Rotoni.

The Sucat local government charges fees for use of the covered court and gazebo, as well as for banca rentals and fishing activities within the park.

Gallery

See also
 List of parks in Metro Manila

References

Parks in Metro Manila
Buildings and structures in Muntinlupa
Redeveloped ports and waterfronts in the Philippines
Laguna de Bay